Brazil–Haiti relations refers to the current and historical relations between the Federative Republic of Brazil and the Republic of Haiti. Both nations are members of the Community of Latin American and Caribbean States, Organization of American States and the United Nations.

History
Haiti was the first Latin-American nation to gain independence in 1804. This result inspired several nations in the region in their struggle for independence. In 1928, Brazil and Haiti established diplomatic relations. That same year, both nations opened diplomatic legations in their respective capitals. In 1953, the level of representation was raised to an embassy. Initially, relations between both nations took place in multilateral forums such as at the Organization of American States.

In June 2004, the United Nations Stabilisation Mission in Haiti (UNSTAMIH) was created as a result of the 2004 Haitian coup d'état. In 2008, Brazilian President Luiz Inácio Lula da Silva paid an official visit to Haiti. During his visit, President da Silva met with President René Préval and he met with the Brazilian soldiers stationed in Haiti as part of the UN mission. In January 2010, Haiti was struck by a 7.0 earthquake. Brazil soon donated to the Haiti Reconstruction Fund (FRH), in the amount of US$55 million. In April 2010, Haitian President René Préval travelled to Brazil to attend the Brazil-Caribbean Community (CARICOM) Summit.

In February 2012, Brazilian President Dilma Rousseff paid a state visit to Haiti. During her visit, she met with President Michel Martelly and Prime Minister Garry Conille. On the agenda were economic ties and the efforts to assist Haitian refugees arriving in Brazil since the 2010 Haitian earthquake of which more than 15,000 Haitians have immigrated to Brazil. In 2012, the National Immigration Council of Brazil eliminated the limit of twelve hundred annual permanent visas for humanitarian reasons, which could be granted to Haitian nationals.

In June 2017, Brazilian Foreign Minister Aloysio Nunes traveled to Haiti to participate in the ceremony for the transfer of command from Brazil and reviewed the last military contingent of Brazilian MINUSTAH troops, thus marking the final period of Brazil's mission in Haiti. More than 36,000 Brazilian military personnel have passed through the mission since its establishment in 2004, making Brazil the largest country contributing troops.

High-level visits

High-level visits from Brazil to Haiti
 President Luiz Inácio Lula da Silva (2008)
 Defense Minister Nelson Jobim (2009, 2010, 2011)
 Foreign Minister Antonio Patriota (February and June 2011)
 President Dilma Rousseff (2012)
 Foreign Minister Luiz Alberto Figueiredo (2013)
 Foreign Minister Aloysio Nunes (2017)

High-level visits from Haiti to Brazil
 Foreign Minister Jean Robert Estimé (1982)
 President René Préval (2010)
 Prime Minister Laurent Lamothe (2013)
 Foreign Minister Pierre Duly Brutus (2014)
 Foreign Minister Lener Renauld (2016)

Bilateral agreements
Both nations have signed a few agreements such as an Agreement for Cultural Cooperation (1966); Agreement on Bilateral and Technical Cooperation (1982) and a Tripartite Brazil-Cuba-Haiti Agreement on the Program for Strengthening the Health Authority of Haiti (2010).

Resident diplomatic missions
 Brazil has an embassy in Port-au-Prince.
 Haiti has an embassy in Brasília.

See also 
 Haitian Brazilian

References 

 
 
Haiti
Brazil